Sergey Karyakin may refer to:
Sergey Karjakin (born 1990), Russian chess grandmaster
Sergey Karyakin (pentathlete) (born 1988), Russian modern pentathlete
Sergey Karyakin (racing driver) (born 1991), Russian rally driver